Sir Anthony Shirley, 1st Baronet (1624 - June 1683) was an English politician who sat in the House of Commons between 1654 and 1659.

Shirley was the son of Thomas Shirley of Preston Manor, Brighton and his wife Elizabeth Stapley, daughter of Drew Stapley of London. He matriculated at Magdalen Hall, Oxford, on 14 July 1642 aged 14. He was in the commission of peace for the Commonwealth. In 1654, he was elected Member of Parliament for Arundel in the First Protectorate Parliament. He was elected MP for Sussex  in 1656 for the Second Protectorate Parliament. In 1659 he was elected MP for Steyning in the Third Protectorate Parliament. He was created baronet on 6 March 1666. He was appointed High Sheriff of Sussex in 1667, but did not take office.

Shirley died at the age of  58 and was buried at Preston Manor on 22 June 1683.

Shirley married Anne Onslow, daughter of Sir Richard Onslow of West Clandon, Surrey on 2 July 1650 at Cranleigh, Surrey. He was succeeded in the baronetcy by his son Richard.

References

 

1624 births
1683 deaths
Alumni of Magdalen Hall, Oxford
Baronets in the Baronetage of England
People from Brighton and Hove
People from Steyning
People from Arundel
English MPs 1654–1655
English MPs 1656–1658
English MPs 1659
Onslow family